The global carbon reward is a proposed international policy for establishing and funding a new global carbon market for decarbonising all sectors of the world economy, and for establishing and funding a new economic sector dedicated to carbon dioxide removal (CDR). The policy is market-based, and it will offer proportional financial rewards in exchange for verifiable climate mitigation services and co-benefits. The policy approach was first presented in 2017 by Delton Chen, Joël van der Beek, and Jonathan Cloud to address the 2015 Paris Agreement, and it has since been refined.

The policy employs a carbon currency to establish a global reward price for mitigated carbon. The carbon currency will not convey ownership of mitigated carbon, and consequently the carbon currency cannot function as a carbon offset credit. The carbon currency will function as a financial asset and incentive.

A supranational authority is needed to implement the policy and to manage the supply and demand of the carbon currency. This authority is referred to as the carbon exchange authority. One of the authority's key functions is to coordinate the operations of major central banks in order to give the carbon currency a guaranteed floor price. A predictable rising floor price will attract private investment demand for the currency, and it will transfer a significant portion of the mitigation cost into currency markets. The policy will not result in any direct costs for governments, businesses or citizens. Consequently, the policy has scope to create a new socioeconomic pathway to achieve the goals of the Paris Agreement.

Background 
Since the start of the United Nations Framework Convention on Climate Change (UNFCCC) in 1992, the atmospheric concentration of carbon dioxide (CO2)—a dominant anthropogenic greenhouse gas (GHG)—has risen steadily, as shown by the Keeling Curve. Despite numerous Conference of the Parties (COP) meetings and several treaties, CO2 and other GHG emissions have continued at dangerously high levels.

A major hurdle to a rapid clean energy transition and global economic decarbonisation, is the need to mobilise large amounts of investment finance. According to a study of renewable energy systems by ARENA, the financial shortfall for achieving the goals of the Paris Agreement is about US $27 trillion for the 2016-2050 period. The International Energy Agency (IEA) estimate that investments in clean energy will need to increase to about US $5 trillion per year by 2030 in order to achieve net-zero carbon emissions by 2050. 

Further complicating the economics of climate change is the possibility that cumulative residual CO2 emissions from fossil fuels could reach 850–1,150 GtCO2 for the period 2016–2100 even if stringent policies and carbon taxes are implemented. For these and other reasons there is an apparent need for new policies that can accelerate the transition to low-carbon energy systems and provide large-scale CDR.

The shortfall in climate finance and lack of political cooperation inspired Delton Chen, a civil engineer, to found a climate policy initiative in 2014 with the goal of combining a market mechanism with monetary policy. Seminal ideas for the policy first appeared at the 2015 Earth System Governance conference, Canberra, and in MIT’s Climate Co-Lab competitions where the policy was awarded two prizes. Between 2017–2019, Chen and his colleagues published two policy papers  and in 2018 Guglielmo Zappalà wrote a thesis that compares the new policy with existing central bank policies. In 2019, Chen described the global carbon reward policy in terms of required central bank remits and operations, and the possible application of blockchain technologies.  A website for the global carbon reward was launched on World Environment Day 2021.

Policy name 
The generic name of the climate policy is simply 'carbon reward' or 'global carbon reward', written with lower-case letters. When the policy name is written with capital letters—Global Carbon Reward—then the name is referring to a specific policy development project that has adopted 'Global Carbon Reward' as its brand name. This brand name refers to specific policy versions and associated assets and partnerships. The Global Carbon Reward project was originally called the 'Global 4C Risk Mitigation Policy' or simply 'Global 4C', where 4C is an acronym that stands for complementary currencies for climate change.

Policy type 
The global carbon reward is a market-based climate policy combined with a monetary standard for mitigated carbon. The global carbon reward is justified in terms of a market hypothesis that posits a need to create a positive externality, designed to manage the systemic risks associated with anthropogenic carbon emissions. The term 'reward' is used to distinguish the market incentive from other more conventional incentives, such as carbon taxes, cap and trade, subsidies, and carbon offsets.

The market-based instrument is called a carbon currency. The policy instrument is a type of representative money that will be managed with a new monetary policy that can coordinate the world's major central banks to establish a predictable floor price for the carbon currency. The new monetary policy is called carbon quantitative easing, and it is a supranational policy because it will coordinate the quantitative easing and currency trading by central banks on a global level.

Pricing mitigated carbon 
There are three typical methods for pricing anthropogenic GHGs that have been mitigated. 

 The first method is to use a market policy to price the mass of avoided carbon emissions in relation to an emissions' baseline.
 The second method is to use a market policy to price the mass of carbon that is removed from the ambient atmosphere using negative emissions technologies. 
 The third method is to let the marketplace price the GHGs that have been turned into saleable commodities. For example, the conversion of CO2 into plant products or graphene for the manufacture of durable goods. 

The global carbon reward employs the first two methods, and it has scope to incentivise the third method by registering the resulting durable goods as a co-benefit.

Not a subsidy 
The term "reward" is used to differentiate the global carbon reward from government subsidies. The global carbon reward is different to a government subsidy because (1) the reward is issued with a representative currency and not with a national currency; (2) the reward is funded with international monetary policy and private currency trading, and not through fiscal spending; and (3) the reward is performance-based whereas subsidies are not necessarily dependent on performance. 

The global carbon reward aims to create a price signal with a carbon currency, and as such the reward is not a Pigovian subsidy. Market participants are invited to trade the carbon currency as an investment. If the Coase theorem is applied, then it may be assumed that market participants will discover the reward price in a way that shares the mitigation costs in a Pareto optimal outcome.

The global carbon reward is a new kind of performance-based grant system.  It is also a new kind of results-based climate financing (RBCF). According to the World Bank, RBCF is "...a well-established financing modality in the health and education sectors but it is still in an early stage of deployment in the area of climate change".

Not a carbon offset 
The global carbon reward is not a carbon offset credit. A carbon offset is a recorded reduction in CO2 or other greenhouse gas emissions that is used to compensate for emissions made elsewhere. The reward is issued as a currency that does not convey ownership of the mitigated carbon. All of the mitigated carbon that is awarded will be immediately retired from carbon markets and will be held by the authority for the policy, called the carbon exchange authority.

Carbon stock take 
The carbon currency will be directly indexed to the carbon stock take for the policy, meaning that one unit of the carbon currency will directly correspond to a specific mass of CO2e that is mitigated for a specific duration. This indexing relationship is defined by the unit of account of the carbon currency, which is 1 tCO2e mitigated for a 100-year duration. The total supply of the carbon currency will thus remain proportional to the carbon stock take.

The carbon stock take will be owned and managed by the carbon exchange authority. This is analogous to the U.S. Department of the Treasury holding gold for the gold window of the Bretton Woods system except that the carbon currency is not redeemable for mitigated carbon. If the carbon stock take falls as a result of individual enterprises defaulting on their service-level agreements, then the supply of the carbon currency can be reduced proportionally with a negative interest rate charge, otherwise called a demurrage fee.

Causal mechanisms 
The effectiveness of the global carbon reward policy will depend on a set of causal mechanisms that can remove financial bottlenecks and trigger a major shift in market behaviour for the scaling-up of effective climate action. The policy relies on a chain of causal mechanisms that are social, informational, financial and political. These include (1) the provision of globally available performance-based grants for mitigated carbon, (2) the provision of a global database for mitigation technologies and the statistics that describe their effectiveness and profitability, (3) the channeling of the mitigation cost into the foreign exchange currency market to resolve conflicts over cost sharing, and (4) the provision of individual service-level agreements for tracking and managing the carbon stock take over the long-term. The policy can also be integrated with other market and non-market policies in a (5) 'carrot and stick' approach for maximising societal cooperation.

Current status 
The theoretical background to the global carbon reward is presented in several publications and a thesis, but the policy has yet to be reviewed by policy institutions or government officials.

Popular culture 
The American science fiction writer, Kim Stanley Robinson, embraced the idea of a 'carbon coin' in his climate change novel The Ministry for the Future. The novel portrays a series of events that lead to the establishment of a transnational organisation that is mandated to deploy carbon coins to address the Paris Agreement. The author’s inspiration for using carbon coins is attributed in the novel to Delton Chen, via the phrase “Chen’s papers”.

Policy design

Policy objectives 
The main objective of the global carbon reward is to avoid passing specific levels of average global surface warming. The climate objective needs to be defined in terms of global average temperature changes and associated probabilities of success. For example, the climate objective could be to avoid a maximum of 1.5 °C, 2.0 °C, and 2.5 °C of global warming with confidence levels of 50%, 67%, 90%, respectively. The policy’s main objective is normative, and it may be aligned with the goals of the 2015 Paris Agreement.

Secondary objectives of the global carbon reward are to maximise the co-benefits and to minimise the harms that are directly associated with the actions that are rewarded under the policy. These co-benefits may be divided into (1) energy reliability, (2) community wellbeing, and (3) ecological health, and they may also be categorised using the UN’s sustainable development goals.

Policy instrument 
The carbon currency is the economic instrument of the proposed market policy. The carbon currency will be used to (a) financially reward enterprises for mitigating carbon under the policy rules, (b) create a predictable global reward price for mitigated carbon, and (c) record the carbon stock take for the policy.

The carbon currency will be a type of representative money with a unit of account of 1 tCO2e mitigated for a 100-year duration, or similar. The carbon currency will act primarily as a store of value, and not as a medium of exchange. It will not be used as a medium of exchange in the sense that it will not be accepted for paying taxes or for making regular business transactions. The carbon currency will be readily tradable for other currencies via foreign exchange providers and remittance dealers. The supply and floor price of the carbon currency will be used to monitor progress on global economic decarbonisation and the associated systemic risks.

Pricing mechanism 
The pricing mechanism for the global carbon reward is understood in terms of the supply and demand functions for the carbon currency. The supply function is the rate at which the carbon currency is created and issued in order to reward enterprises that have successfully mitigated carbon under the rules of the policy. The demand function is underpinned by a floor price that is guaranteed by central banks, and by private demand for the currency in response to a rising or falling trend in the floor price.

Floor price 
As indicated above, the demand function for the carbon currency is underpinned by a guaranteed floor price. This floor price will be enforced by central banks through a reflexive monetary policy that triggers currency trades/swaps in open markets when necessary. 

It is important to note that the floor price for the carbon currency will be the price signal that incentivises market actors to invest in mitigation projects. The price signal will be communicated as a combination of (a) the spot price for the carbon currency, and (b) the future floor price that will span a rolling 100-year period. The spot price may rise to any level under market forces, but it will never fall below the floor price because the monetary policy, called carbon quantitative easing (CQE), will be enacted to defend the floor price.

The future floor price for a rolling 100-year period will be divided into two parts: a rolling guaranteed period that spans a decade or two, followed by a rolling non-guaranteed period that spans the remainder of the 100-years. The future floor price constitutes the forward guidance that will be communicated to markets so that enterprises can make informed decisions when decarbonising their operations. It is presumed that enterprises that decarbonise will develop their own financial plans that account for the required capital investment, technological innovations, and other design factors. Given that rapid decarbonisation might introduce operational and financial risks, the purpose of the floor price is to de-risk the investments by providing a predictable revenue source that may be designated as debt-free and bankable.

Currency demand 
Private demand for the carbon currency will be generated by a rising floor price. The ideal floor price will be calibrated to achieve the climate objective, and the technical name for this ideal floor price is the risk cost of carbon (RCC). 

Private demand for the carbon currency will be highest when the floor price is rising most quickly, and it will be least when the floor price is falling most quickly. If at any time this private demand is not sufficient to maintain the floor price, central banks will make up the shortfall by buying the carbon currency via CQE.

Currency supply 
As indicated above, the supply function for the carbon currency is based on assessing the mass of carbon dioxide equivalent (CO2e) that has been mitigated at the project level. This will involve setting emissions baselines, and applying standardised methods of measurement, reporting and verification. The adopted baselines and standards will be specified in service-level agreements. 

The carbon currency may be offered for four kinds of mitigation service: (i) the supply of cleaner energy in specific energy markets; (ii) the consumption of cleaner energy, goods and services by businesses and households; (iii) the removal of carbon from the ambient atmosphere, and (iv) the implementation of ethical population management.

The gross amount of carbon currency that will be offered to enterprises will be proportional to the notional mass of carbon that each enterprise can verifiably mitigate over the long-term. The adjusted amount of carbon currency that will be offered to enterprises will equal the gross reward plus/minus any positive/negative adjustments. The positive adjustments are to reflect socio-ecological co-benefits, and the negative adjustments are to reflect socio-ecological harms.

Funding model 
The funding model for the policy is based on the above mentioned demand function for the carbon currency. This funding model will not result in any direct costs for governments, businesses or citizens because the mitigation cost will be channelled into the foreign exchange currency market when the world's major national currencies are devalued relative to the carbon currency. One advantage of this funding model is that it will allow governments to focus more on national priorities, such as climate adaptation, because global markets will be motivated and coordinated to achieve the agreed climate objective.

The policy is designed in such a way as to create a self-funding administrative system. The cost of the policy's administration and policing will be recovered through fees and commissions that will be charged to enterprises that earn the carbon currency as a reward.

Institutional Framework 
The institutional framework for implementing the global carbon reward will need to have the capacity to establish a supranational institution for managing the carbon currency with carbon quantitative easing (CQE). The proposed supranational institution is notionally called the carbon exchange authority. One option is to establish the carbon exchange authority under the auspices of the UNFCCC and in response to the Paris Agreement. Unlike previous treaties and agreements under the UNFCCC, the carbon exchange authority will interface with central banks via protocols for CQE, and this may require new channels for intergovernmental coordination, new mandates for central banks, and new legal structures for policy governance, international trade, and dispute resolution.

Social principles 
Common But Differentiated Responsibilities (CBDR) is the guiding principle of the UNFCCC. The CBDR principle was formalised at the Earth Summit in Rio de Janeiro, 1992. CBDR acknowledges that all states have a shared obligation to address environmental destruction, and that countries that have produced the most greenhouse gases should contribute proportionally more to climate change mitigation. CBDR is therefore consistent with the polluter pays principle. 

The polluter pays principle has limitations when there is insufficient cooperation over cost sharing for the goal of protecting the global commons. Delton Chen and his colleagues propose that a new social principle is needed, called the preventative insurance principle, to explain the social context of the global carbon reward. This principle states that in order to protect the global commons — including the climate system and the planetary ecosystem — it is necessary to maximise societal cooperation by managing the mitigation costs in a way that avoids direct taxation and avoids fiscal spending by governments. The preventative insurance principle acknowledges that effective climate mitigation should be a priority given that future climate damages could be systemic, extreme, and irreversible if not adequately mitigated. The preventative insurance principle is combined with the polluter pays principle to justify a policy toolkit that consists of complementary 'carrot' and 'stick' policies.

Economic theory

Holistic market hypothesis 
Under standard economic theory, as elaborated by leading economists such as Nicholas Stern and William Nordhaus, the market failure in carbon has resulted in a negative externality, called the social cost of carbon (SCC). According to standard theory, the SCC is a measure of the time-discounted climate-related damages caused by 1 tCO2 emitted in a given year. The SCC is used to estimate the ideal carbon tax under cost-benefit analysis.

Delton Chen, Joël van der Beek and Jonathan Cloud articulate an alternative theory, called the Holistic Market Hypothesis (HMH), that proposes that the standard theory is incomplete because the systemic risks that are structurally linked to the anthropogenic carbon balance are not addressed using the welfare theory of Arthur Cecil Pigou. The HMH states that systemic risks are probabilistic at the first order, and are therefore different to climate damages. The International Organization for Standardization (ISO) defines risk as the “effect of uncertainty on objectives”  giving credence to the notion that systemic risks are not the same as social costs.

The HMH expands on the theory of Pigou by further proposing that the systemic risks associated with the anthropogenic carbon balance are unusually large and should be associated with a second externality — a positive externality. Under the HMH, the systemic risks associated with anthropogenic carbon are addressed with a second explicit price — a reward price. The reward price should be managed independently of carbon taxes, cap-and-trade, subsidies and carbon offsets.

Risk cost of carbon 
Under the HMH, the market failure in anthropogenic carbon is revised at the conceptual level to include a positive externality. The HMH thus makes the claim that the market failure in carbon consists of two externalised costs—the social cost of carbon (SCC) and the risk cost of carbon (RCC)—which are opposite and complementary. The RCC is used to quantify the positive externality, and it is evaluated using risk-effectiveness analysis. The RCC is then priced into the marketplace with a carbon currency, which is used to reward enterprises for their positive climate action.

The RCC is conceptualised as the cost of managing systemic risks that are coupled to the anthropogenic carbon balance. The RCC includes the cost of overcoming or bypassing societal systems that act as barriers to the decarbonisation of the world economy. These societal system may include monetary systems, financial systems, political systems, legal systems, etc. The RCC also includes the cost of responding preemptively to Earth systems that can produce positive climate feedbacks on carbon emissions and possible tipping points. These Earth systems include the atmosphere, cryosphere, hydrosphere, biosphere, and pedosphere, and their interactions.

The RCC is assessed as the average marginal cost of mitigating 1 tonne of CO2e for a 100-year duration, such that the global rate of mitigation is sufficient to achieve the agreed climate objective. The value of the RCC is used to establish the ideal floor price of the carbon currency. The carbon currency is an essential tool of the policy because the carbon currency can be used to bypasses the existing financial system and avoid financial intermediaries and bottlenecks. 

The RCC is created ex post to the introduction of the global carbon reward policy. This differs to the SCC, which is generated ex ante to the introduction of the carbon tax. The internalisation of the RCC into the economy should produce a positive externality because it will create a new global carbon market that has the qualities of a global public good. The positive externality is a global public good because it will produce benefits that are non-rivalrous, non-excludable, and available worldwide.

Relational diagram for market policies 
The manner in which the SCC and RCC are addressed in the HMH, is explained using a relational diagram that identifies four market-based policies as the principal options for pricing carbon. The relational diagram classifies market-based policies according to two important policy functions: (a) unit of account, and (b) store of value. 

The relational diagram is a matrix with two columns and two rows. The two columns refer to 'fiat units' or 'carbon units' as the binary option for the unit of account of the policy tool. The two rows refer to ‘sticks’ or ‘carrots’ as the binary option for the policy tool, whereby a stick has a negative store of value, and a carrot has a positive store of value.

Delton Chen calls this relational diagram the carbon pricing matrix.  The matrix denotes four market policies: the (1) carbon tax, (2) carbon subsidy, (3) cap and trade, and (4) global carbon reward. The left side of the carbon pricing matrix is consistent with Arthur C. Pigou’s 1920 treatise on externalised costs and his proposed method of pricing negative externalities with taxes, and pricing positive externalities with subsidies. The objective of the carbon tax is ostensibly to achieve allocative efficiency by internalising the SCC. In standard economics there is no mention of an explicit objective when using the carbon subsidy, although such subsidies have been used, such as the 45Q tax credit in the United States for carbon oxide capture and sequestration.

The right side of the carbon pricing matrix is linked to the Coase theorem for private bargaining because the policies on the right employ tradable permits and tokens with carbon units. The advantage of using tradable permits and tokens is the ability to achieve a Pareto optimal outcome. Cap and trade (e.g. South Korea's emissions trading scheme) aims to internalise the SCC via the trading of emissions permits however the objective of cap and trade policies is not explicit because the stringency of the cap is subject to other considerations besides the SCC.

The right side of the carbon pricing matrix frames the ideation of the global carbon reward. 'Carbon currency' is the name given to the tradable token that is the reward. For this particular policy, the strategy is to assign a floor price to the carbon currency in order to target the required mitigation rate. The currency is then issued to market actors who successfully mitigate carbon. The actual price of the carbon currency is then discovered by allowing the currency to be traded above its assigned floor price. The approach will invite private currency trading—an example of Coasian bargaining—for achieving a Pareto optimal outcome with regards to the distribution of the mitigation cost. The RCC will be fully internalised into the economy when sufficient carbon mitigation is provided to achieve the policy's main objective.

The HMH is a theory that claims that the market failure in carbon is not a classical market failure because of the large systemic risks that are inherent to the fast carbon cycle. The HMH also says that ‘carrot and stick’ carbon pricing is needed to correct the market failure in carbon. The two explicit carbon prices that are recommended, are as follows: (1) a 'stick' to maximise the efficiency of the marketplace according to the marginal social welfare theory of Pigou, and (2) a 'carrot' to manage the systemic risks associated with the anthropogenic carbon balance. The HMH ultimately says that correcting the market failure in carbon requires a trade-off between the two main objectives, such that some economic efficiency could be sacrificed in order to limit the systemic risks.

Resolving temporal paradoxes 
The estimation of the SCC has attracted considerable attention from economists and it is often controversial because of the sensitivity of the SCC to the social discount rate (SDR). A relatively high SDR will result in a lower carbon tax, short-term planning, and less regard for future generations. The narrative surrounding the SDR is often split between two sides, with one side favouring a descriptive SDR and a relatively low carbon tax, and the other side favouring an ethical (i.e. prescriptive) SDR and a relatively high carbon tax. The HMH offers a resolution to this problem by introducing a second policy tool (i.e. the carbon currency) and a second policy objective of internalising the RCC into the economy (i.e. to manage the climate-related systemic risk). The RCC is determined independently of marginal social welfare and the SDR, and so it is not affected by time discounting.

The Tragedy of the Horizon paradoxes are anecdotes presented by Marc Carney in reference to the short planning horizon of central banks in relation to risk management. They also refer to the more general problem that the current generation is weakly incentivised to fix the climate problem for future generations. Delton Chen infers that the rising floor price for the carbon currency — based on the RCC — will produce a secular bull market in the carbon currency for resolving these paradoxes. In other words, Chen’s solution is to “…convert tomorrow’s risk into today’s profits”. This may be restated as follows: the carbon currency will act as a negative feedback on global warming because it is an investment-grade currency that is pro-cyclical with the climate risk.

Policy for net-zero carbon 
Delton Chen and his co-authors propose that the carbon currency can be used to create a new roadmap to net-zero carbon emissions. They propose that the world economy can be reconfigured as a dual-market system, comprising (a) existing markets that use national fiat currencies to price goods and services, and (b) a global market for carbon mitigating services and for receiving the carbon currency as a reward. Existing markets are framed by official national currencies, whereas the new global market will be framed by the carbon currency which does not act as a medium-of-exchange but instead acts as a price signal and store-of-value. Furthermore, they propose that the global annual mitigation rate, that earns the carbon currency can be sub-divided into: (1) the portion that is economically coupled to existing markets, ; and (2) the portion that is economically decoupled from existing markets, . The mitigation rate that is decoupled, will be dependent on the economic value of the carbon currency given that this currency will be the primary source of funding for carbon dioxide removal (CDR).

Modified Kaya identity 
The original Kaya identity relates global CO2 emissions to various factors, including gross world product, denoted as G.  If the global carbon reward is fully implemented, then the carbon currency should be available as a reward in every country, but the carbon currency will not have the status of legal tender (i.e. it is not a medium of exchange). Subsequently, the trading of goods and services with the carbon currency will not be allowed, and so the carbon currency will not factor in the calculation of gross domestic product (GDP) or G. However, the carbon currency will influence G because the currency will be used to increase the marginal value of the goods and services that have utility for reducing CO2 emissions or for removing CO2 from the ambient atmosphere.

Delton Chen and his co-authors propose that the total mass of anthropogenic CO2 that will be emitted globally can be described using a modified version of the Kaya identity, as shown below. In this modified version of the Kaya identity, that portion of mitigated CO2 that is decoupled from the economy, is subtracted from the original Kaya identity:

Where:

 F is global CO2 emissions from human sources
 P is global population
 G is world GDP
 E is global energy consumption
  is the economic decoupling factor
 Q is the global mitigated CO2 that is rewarded with carbon currency

And:

 G/P is the GDP per capita
 E/G is the energy intensity of the GDP
 F/E is the carbon footprint of energy
Q is the economically-decoupled carbon dioxide removal (CDR)

Delton Chen and his co-authors propose that   will be significant because carbon dioxide removal (CDR) constitutes a new economic sector that is mostly unrelated to previous economic activity. Also, various negative emissions technologies (NETs) can be powered directly by the sun and other kinds of renewable energy, and as such a certain portion of CDR will be self-reliant in terms of energy inputs.

With reference to the above formula, the global carbon reward can be used to reduce F in absolute terms by incentivising the following:

ethical reductions in global population, P, relative to a baseline
 reductions in the average carbon intensity of goods and services, F/G, relative to a baseline
 reductions in the average carbon intensity of energy supplied, F/E, relative to a baseline
increases in global CDR and its planned decoupling from the mainstream economy,  Q

The above four activities may be undertaken to increase absolute reductions in F until net-zero carbon (i.e. F = 0) is achieved. Delton Chen names the economic growth pattern that will result from these activities as optimal growth. By giving the carbon currency a predictable rising floor price, the carbon currency will attract investment demand from institutional investors and households. Furthermore, projects that are effective at mitigating carbon will report higher revenue and higher profits, and as such the carbon currency can act as an index for the profitability and effectiveness of low-carbon investments. By inviting households to invest in the carbon currency, the resulting increase in the average savings rate of the participating households could help reduce household consumption. 

All of the above mentioned effects, when combined, might indirectly reduce G and E, but optimal growth does not include incentives for explicitly reducing G or E. The global carbon reward only treats G and E as a dependent variables, given that economic decarbonisation will influence G and E. Observed changes in the quantity and the quality of G and E will be used in a feedback loop in the assessment of the carbon currency's floor price, and in the design of the reward rules. 

If reducing G or E in absolute terms were to be adopted as an explicit policy objective, then this would constitute a different policy approach, called economic de-growth. According to a quantitative assessment by Keyßer and Lenzen, de-growth scenarios appear less risky than technology-driven pathways that support more consumption and economic growth. Economic de-growth and solar geoengineering are two additional mitigation strategies that could be considered if the global carbon reward and conventional policies are insufficient for achieving the desired climate objective. The global carbon reward policy does not financially reward economic de-growth or solar geoengineering, and as such implementing these strategies will require additional policies.

References

External links 
 https://globalcarbonreward.org

Climate change mitigation